was the lead ship of her class of light cruiser in the Imperial Japanese Navy. She was named after the Nagara River in the Chūbu region of Japan.

Background
Nagara, as with the other vessels of her class, was intended for use as the flagship of a destroyer flotilla, and it was in that role that she participated in the invasions of the Philippines and the Dutch East Indies after the attack on Pearl Harbor.

Design

The Nagara-class vessels were essentially identical to the earlier s, using the same hull design, powerplant and layout of armament. The main differences were in the design of the bridge, which was raised to allow for an aircraft hangar and launch platform above the No.2 gun in front of the bridge. Another change was the installation of the new, larger Type 93 torpedoes, which required an extension of the main deck.

All vessels in the class were modified extensively during their operational lives, with no two vessels modified in the same way.

Service career

Early career
Nagara was laid down on 9 September 1920, launched on 25 April 1921 and completed at Sasebo Naval Arsenal, and commissioned on 21 April 1922. Soon after commissioning, Nagara was assigned to the Japanese naval base at Port Arthur, from where she patrolled the China coast to Tsingtao. She was commanded by Captain Takeo Takagi from November 1933 to November 1934 and by Captain Sadamichi Kajioka from November 1935 to December 1936.
As the Second Sino-Japanese War continued to escalate, Nagara was assigned to provide cover for Japanese transports during the Battle of Shanghai, and remained on station patrolling the China coast and the Yangtze River through 1939. From 30 January 1941 to 8 April 1941, Nagara assisted in the Invasion of French Indochina. From 10 June 1941 to 9 September 1941, Nagara provided coverage for the landings of Japanese troops in southern China.

Invasion of the Philippines and Dutch East Indies
On 10 September 1941. On 26 November 1941, as flagship of Rear Admiral Kyuji Kubo's Fourth Surprise Attack Unit, Nagara was based at Palau at the time of the attack on Pearl Harbor.

From 11–12 December 1941, Nagara covered the landings of troops at Legaspi, Luzon, Philippines, returning again from 24–30 December 1941 to cover additional landings at several points on southeast Luzon.

In January 1942, Nagara was tasked with escorting the convoy landing the Sasebo No. 1 Special Naval Landing Force (SNLF) at Menado and Kendari in the Celebes. On 25 January 1942, while at Kendari, the destroyer  collided with Nagara, damaging the cruiser's hull. Rear Admiral Kubo transferred his flag to the destroyer , and Nagara withdrew to Davao for repairs.

Returning to the Celebes on 4 February 1942, Rear Admiral Kubō transferred his flag back to Nagara, which then covered the invasion of Makassar.

On 17 February 1942, Nagara provided escort for transports with the Imperial Japanese Army's 48th Infantry Division for the invasion of Bali and Java. During the operation, the Royal Navy submarine  fired six torpedoes at Nagara, but all missed.

On 10 March 1942, the Third Fleet was replaced by the Second Southern Expeditionary Fleet under Vice Admiral Takahashi. Nagara remained in Rear Admiral Kenzaburō Hara's 16th Cruiser Division with the light cruisers  and Natori.
 
On 29 March 1942, Nagara was part of the force sent to capture Christmas Island. During the operation, the submarine  fired three torpedoes at Nagara, but all missed.

Nagara departed for Japan on 2 April 1942, where she was in drydock at Maizuru Naval Arsenal from 12 to 24 April 1942.

Battle of Midway
On 4 June 1942 Nagara unsuccessfully counter-attacked the submarine  after the latter attempted to torpedo Kirishima.

Nagara returned safely to Japan on 13 June 1942. She brought about 500 wounded to Hashirajima, where they were transferred to the hospital ship Hikawa Maru on 15 June.

Battle of the Solomon Islands
On 14 July 1942, the 10th Destroyer Flotilla with Nagara was reassigned to the Third Fleet, which departed for Truk, Caroline Islands on 16 August 1942.

On 25 August 1942, Nagara participated in the Battle of the Eastern Solomons, which it survived without damage, arriving at Truk on 5 September 1942. From Truk, Nagara made a number of sorties towards the Solomon Islands in September. On 25–26 October 1942, Nagara participated in the Battle of Santa Cruz, and again returned to Truk undamaged.

On 9 November 1942, Rear Admiral Kimura and the Nagara squadron was assigned to screen Hiei and Kirishima during a reinforcement plan to land 14,500 men, heavy weapons and supplies on Guadalcanal. The landing was preceded by a bombardment of Henderson Field by the battleships. This action became the First Naval Battle of Guadalcanal on 13 November 1942. Nagara was straddled by shells from the cruiser  taking a direct hit by one  shell which killed six crewmen but which caused only minor hull damage. Nagara retired westward around Savo Island escorting Kirishima with Hiei in tow, but Hiei was later sunk by planes from Henderson Field, USS Enterprise and B-17 Flying Fortress bombers from Espiritu Santo .

This led to the Naval Battle of Guadalcanal on 15 November 1942. Nagara and her destroyers engaged the Americans with gunfire and Type 93 "Long Lance" torpedoes. During the action, more than 30 torpedoes were launched at the battleship , but all missed. On the Japanese side, Kirishima and destroyer  were lost, but Nagara was undamaged, and returned to Truk on 18 November 1942.

On 20 November 1942, Nagara became flagship of Rear Admiral Takama's 4th Destroyer Flotilla. The newly commissioned  replaced Nagara as flagship of 10th Destroyer Flotilla. The 4th Destroyer Flotilla consisted of three divisions of nine destroyers: 2nd Destroyer Division with three destroyers, 9th Destroyer Division with two and 27th Destroyer Division with four.

After returning to Maizuru for refit at the end of 1942, Nagaras No. 5 140-mm gun was removed. During gunnery exercises off Saipan, Nagara sustained minor superstructure damage after an accidental shell explosion. Nagara returned to Truk on 25 January 1943.

In early February, Nagara participated in the evacuation of Guadalcanal, recovering 11,700 surviving Imperial Japanese Army troops.

In June 1943, Nagara transported the Yokosuka No. 2 Special Naval Landing Force for the occupation of Nauru.

Operations in the South Pacific
In July 1943, Nagara was involved in escorting the aircraft carrier  while ferrying aircraft to Kavieng, New Guinea. While mooring, Nagara detonated a mine laid at night by Australian PBY Catalina flying boats. The mine slightly damaged her bottom under the stern, and she was able to operate.

Nagara was relieved as flagship of 2nd Destroyer Flotilla by the newly commissioned cruiser  on 20 August 1943, and was reassigned to the IJN 8th Fleet under Vice Admiral, Baron Tomoshige Samejima. Nagara also returned to Maizuru for refit with a Type 21 air-search radar and four twin-mount Type 96 25 mm AA guns.

On 1 November 1943, Nagara relieved  as flagship of the Fourth Fleet under Vice Admiral Masami Kobayashi. On 14 November 1943, she assisted in towing the light cruiser Agano back to Truk after it had been torpedoed by the submarine .

On 22 November 1943, Nagara sortied from Truk in response to the American invasion of Tarawa and the Gilbert Islands, arriving at Kwajalein on 26 November 1943.

At Maizuru Naval Arsenal from 26 January 1944, Nagara was again modified. The No. 7 140-mm gun mount was removed and replaced by a 127-mm unshielded HA gun mount. The fore and aft twin torpedo tubes were removed and replaced by two quadruple mounts aft. The aircraft catapult was removed and replaced by two triple-mount Type 96 25 mm AA gun mounts bringing the Nagaras 25 mm total to 22 barrels (2x3, 6x2, 4x1). Depth charge rails were installed in the stern and a Type 93 hydrophone set was fitted in the bow.

On 15 May 1944, Nagara replaced the cruiser  as flagship of 11th Destroyer Flotilla, directly under the Combined Fleet. She remained in Japanese home waters training with new destroyers and escorting a convoy to the Ogasawara Islands in June and to Okinawa in July. In another refit at Yokosuka Naval Arsenal on 2 July 1944, ten single-mount Type 96 25 mm AA guns were installed, bringing Nagaras 25 mm total to 32 barrels (2X3, 6x2, 14x1). A Type 22 surface-search radar was fitted.

On 7 August 1944, en route from Kagoshima to Sasebo, Nagara was spotted by the submarine  on her first war patrol. The captain and 348 crewmen went down with the ship, but 235 crewmen were rescued.

Nagara was removed from the Navy List on 10 October 1944.

Notes

References

 
 
 tabular record:   CombinedFleet.com: Nagara history

Further reading

Nagara-class cruisers
Ships built by Sasebo Naval Arsenal
1921 ships
Second Sino-Japanese War cruisers of Japan
World War II cruisers of Japan
Ships sunk by American submarines
Ships of the Battle of Midway
World War II shipwrecks in the East China Sea
Maritime incidents in August 1944